The 2006 Huntingdonshire District Council election took place on 4 May 2006 to elect members of Huntingdonshire District Council in Cambridgeshire, England. One third of the council was up for election and the Conservative Party stayed in overall control of the council.

After the election, the composition of the council was:
Conservative 40
Liberal Democrats 10
Independent 2

Election result
The Liberal Democrat gain in Huntingdon East by David Priestman was the first time the party had won a seat in the town of Huntingdon on the council.

Ward results

By-elections between 2006 and 2007

Earith

St Neots Eaton Ford

Warboys and Bury

References

2006 English local elections
2006
2000s in Cambridgeshire